The Time Opener is volume twenty-one in the French comic book (or bande dessinée) science fiction series Valérian and Laureline created by writer Pierre Christin and artist Jean-Claude Mézières. It continues the story begun in At the Edge of the Great Void and continued in The Order of the Stones. It was released in January 2010. It is the last volume in the series.

Plot
The Wolochs, giant stones coming from the Great Void beyond the edge of the universe, are bringing destruction to all civilizations, threatening them with total annihilation. On the planet Simlane, Valérian and Laureline are rescuing Valérian's children (see Heroes of the Equinox), while on the planet Syrte, capital of the Empire of a Thousand Planets, a counterattack is being organized by Ky-Gaï and Schniarfeur. In the meantime, Jal and Kistna are enlisting the help of Ralph, a Glapum'tien with a capability to instantly calculate the trajectory of any object. Later, Laureline reunites with Mr Albert at the Asteroids of Shimballil to pick up the Caliphon at the boarding school.

Point Central has also been partially devastated by the Wolochs. There Valérian and Laureline learn from the Shingouz that Sat is rallying the exiled species of Point Central's industrial depths to throw their support behind the Wolochs. They also learn from the twin-detectives Frankie and Harry that opportunists including the Rubanis Triumvirate, the Caliph of Iksaladam, Irmgaal, Ortzog, Blumflum, and the Blopiks, are also supporting the Wolochs, causing further chaos in the anarchic universe. The Mortis Quartet try to assassinate Valérian and Laureline but they escape in their astroship.

Valérian and Laureline return to Syrte where their friends are gathering for the ultimate war against the Stones from the Void and its supporters. Arriving on Syrte are Schroeder, Sun Rae, Doctor Chal' Darouine, and the Alflololians. They are also reunited with Mr. Albert, Caliphon, Ralph, Valérian's sons, Jal, Kistna, Schniarfeur, Ky-Gaï, Elmir, and Syl. While a never-ending stream of Stones appear out of the Void, final preparations are made for the battle. Valérian is exhorting his friends and allies, and leads the convoy of spaceships to the asteroids at the edge of the Great Void.

During the trip, Valérian and Laureline learn that there is only one history of the Earth: the glorious rise of Galaxity and the disastrous flooding of the Black Century happened concurrently. Along the way, they pick up more allies such as the Shingouz, Singh'a Rough'a, and Lieutenant Molto Cortes. The Rubanis Triumvirate consults with the Wolochs, who suspect that Valérian has found the Time Opener and lure him to the asteroids for complete destruction by the Wolochs.

Valérian and his friends arrive on an asteroid where they meet the Limboz, deplorable creatures from the Great Void who have lost their planet, and possess a mysterious object, the Time Opener, which is activated by the mental power of pure souls. While the Wolochs are rapidly approaching, Valérian and his friends form a circle around the Limboz and the Time Opener, and thereby unleash its great power. Valérian's allies are defeating their enemies, the imprisoned Earth is released from its bonds, takes its place again in the solar system, and the Wolochs disappear into the Void.

With their friends all parting ways, Valérian and Laureline finally return to Galaxity. There nothing has changed, everything is exactly as it was: the technocrats run the city while its citizens still only live for dreams. Not even realizing their great accomplishment, the Chief of the Spatio-Temporal Service does not appreciate a minor insubordination and assigns Valérian and Laureline to separate duties. They are surprised to run into Xombul who came back to live through a temporal disturbance caused by the Time Opener. Xombul no longer wants to change the future of Galaxity but offers to change the future of Valérian and Laureline. Dismayed and no longer feeling at home, they seize this opportunity and jump back in time to present-day Paris.

Valérian and Laureline are found unconscious on a quay as young children. They cannot remember anything and are placed in custody of Mr Albert. Their new life now begins...

Settings
All places visited by Valérian and Laureline have appeared in previous albums. They include:
 Filene city on Planet Simlane (Heroes of the Equinox)
 Planet Syrte (Empire of a Thousand Planets)
 Asteroids of Shimballil (Orphan of the Stars)
 Point Central (Ambassador of the Shadows)
 Asteroids at the edge of the Great Void (At the Edge of the Great Void)
 Galaxity (Bad Dreams)
 Paris (Métro Châtelet, Direction Cassiopeia)

Other locations making a brief reprise include:
 Planet Glapum't (The Ghosts of Inverloch)
 Planet Hypsis (The Rage of Hypsis)

Reviews
The album received only average or disappointing ratings from reviews. Librarie Critic stated "I was, like many, very disappointed with a somewhat weak story". The main criticism is for not being original, for making too many former characters reappear at the expense of developing the story deeper. "Unfortunately this is slowing down the story and we're not taken along in a last great adventure", according to StripInfo. The Belgian newspaper De Standaard even called it "sleep inducing".

The artwork was reviewed as superior but sloppy at times, but the painted pages that are interspersed throughout the album are consistently receiving a positive response from reviewers.

Notes
This album brings almost all the significant characters and other elements from the entire series together, but most have a brief or just a cameo appearance. Listed in order that they first appear in the album with album in which they originally appeared:
 Supreme Mother and Examiner of Filene (Heroes of the Equinox)
 Elmir (Empire of a Thousand Planets)
 Ky-Gaï (At the Edge of the Great Void)
 Schniarfeur (The Living Weapons)
 Alflololians (Argol, Orgal, Lagor, Logar) and Goumon (Welcome to Alflolol)
 Jal and Kistna (On the Frontiers)
 Ralph (The Ghosts of Inverloch)
 Mr. Albert (Métro Châtelet, Direction Cassiopeia)
 Mistress Karlä-Varlä, headmistress of the Star College (Orphan of the Stars)
 Caliphon, son of the Caliph of Iksaladam (Hostages of the Ultralum)
 Shingouz (Ambassador of the Shadows)
 Grumpy Converter from Bluxte (Ambassador of the Shadows)
 Sat and his secretary (In Uncertain Times)
 Twin-detectives Frankie and Harry (Hostages of the Ultralum)
 Rubanis Triumvirate (The Ghosts of Inverloch and The Circles of Power)
 The Trinity of Hypsis (The Rage of Hypsis)
 the Caliph of Iksaladam (Hostages of the Ultralum)
 Irmgaal, Ortzog, and Blumflum (Heroes of the Equinox)
 the Blopiks (The Living Weapons)
 Singh'a Rough'a and Lieutenant Molto Cortes (At the Edge of the Great Void)
 Birds-Of-Madness (Birds of the Master)
 Mortis Quartet (Hostages of the Ultralum)
 Doctor Chal' Darouine (At the Edge of the Great Void)
 Schroeder (The City of Shifting Waters)
 Sun Rae (The City of Shifting Waters)
 A nomadic house of the Lemm people (World Without Stars)
 Sül (Birds of the Master)
 Zypanons of Zyp,  (Métro Châtelet, Direction Cassiopeia)
 Tchoung (On the Frontiers)
 The Limboz (At the Edge of the Great Void)
 Chief of the Spatio-Temporal Service (Bad Dreams)
 Xombul (Bad Dreams)
 Lord Basil and Lady Charlotte Seal (The Ghosts of Inverloch)

The only Valérian album not referenced is On the False Earths.

The album breaks the fourth wall near the end where Mr. Albert refers to the Valérian comic books as the source for the children's names.

References

2010 graphic novels
OuvreTemps, L'